Muzzaffaruddin Khalid (born 25 November 1990) is an Indian first-class cricketer who played for Services.

References

External links
 

1990 births
Living people
Indian cricketers
Services cricketers
Sportspeople from Meerut